James William Crabtree (23 December 1871–18 June 1908) was a gifted English footballer of the end of the 19th century.

Career
Crabtree began his career at Burnley, but left in 1890 and played in non-league football for two years before returning to Burnley for the 1892–93 season. His performances attracted the attention of FA Cup holders, Aston Villa, in 1895. He played alongside Howard Spencer at left-half, and went on to share the captaincy of the club with him.

He won League Championship medals with Villa in 1897, 1899 and 1900, he also lifted the FA Cup in as a part of the Aston Villa team that completed the Double in 1897. He was capped 11 times by England whilst at Villa. Crabtree joined Plymouth Argyle in January 1904 and made four appearances in the Southern League before injury forced him to retire. He then coached at several non-league clubs and later became a pub licensee in Birmingham. He died suddenly at the age of 36. His death was drink related.

Honours
Aston Villa
Football League champions: 1896–97, 1898–99, 1899–00
FA Cup winner: 1897

References

External links
Jimmy Crabtree at Aston Villa Player Database

Jimmy Crabtree at Spartacus Educational

1871 births
1908 deaths
Footballers from Burnley
English footballers
England international footballers
Association football defenders
Burnley F.C. players
Rossendale United F.C. players
Heywood Central F.C. players
Aston Villa F.C. players
Plymouth Argyle F.C. players
English Football League players
Southern Football League players
English Football League representative players
FA Cup Final players